Narendra Bhide (1973 – December 10, 2020, in Pune) was an Indian film score composer, best known for his work on the films Aandhali Koshimbir (2014), Chi Va Chi Sau Ka (2017), Hampi (2017), and Mulshi Pattern (2018). He won a Maharashtra State Film Award in 2011 in the category of Best Music Director.

References 

1973 births
2020 deaths
Indian composers